Mathis Olimb (born February 1, 1986) is a Norwegian professional ice hockey forward, currently playing for Vålerenga of the Fjordkraftligaen (Norway). He is the older brother of fellow Norwegian international Ken André Olimb.

Playing career
Olimb started his professional career in 2002 in the Norwegian GET-league, playing for Vålerenga, where he grew up. In the 2006–07 season, he finished second among the point leaders and was influential in winning the second straight Norwegian national championship with Vålerenga.

In 2007, he joined Augsburger Panther of the Deutsche Eishockey Liga. After two seasons in Germany, he signed a two-year deal with Frölunda HC of the Swedish Elitserien on June 27, 2009. On June 17, 2010, he was signed by the NHL's Chicago Blackhawks to a one-year deal.

Assigned to the Blackhawks' American Hockey League affiliate, the Rockford IceHogs, for the entire 2010–11 campaign, Olimb returned to Frölunda HC at season's end signing a two-year contract on April 29, 2011. He would play for Frölunda until the end of the 2014-15 campaign. In his last season with Frölunda, Olimb also competed in the Champions Hockey League with the club: In 13 contests, he scored eight goals and tallied 18 assists en route to 2014-15 Champions Hockey League MVP honors.

On April 15, 2015, he signed for Jokerit of the KHL, and moved on to the Kloten Flyers of the Swiss NLA in December 2015. After spending the remainder of the season with the Flyers, Olimb inked a deal with Sweden's Linköpings HC in April 2016, where he would play alongside his brother Ken André.

On May 24, 2019, having played the previous three seasons in Sweden, Olimb left as a free agent and returned to the DEL in signing a two-year contract with German club, Grizzlys Wolfsburg.

International play
Olimb was named to the Norway men's national ice hockey team for competition at the 2014 IIHF World Championship.

Career statistics

Regular season and playoffs

International

References

External links

1986 births
Augsburger Panther players
Frölunda HC players
Grizzlys Wolfsburg players
Ice hockey players at the 2010 Winter Olympics
Ice hockey players at the 2014 Winter Olympics
Ice hockey players at the 2018 Winter Olympics
Jokerit players
EHC Kloten players
Linköping HC players
Living people
London Knights players
Manglerud Star Ishockey players
Norwegian expatriate ice hockey people
Norwegian expatriate sportspeople in Canada
Norwegian expatriate sportspeople in Germany
Norwegian expatriate sportspeople in Sweden
Norwegian expatriate sportspeople in the United States
Norwegian expatriate sportspeople in Finland
Norwegian expatriate sportspeople in Switzerland
Norwegian ice hockey centres
Olympic ice hockey players of Norway
Rockford IceHogs (AHL) players
Sarnia Sting players
Skellefteå AIK players
Ice hockey people from Oslo
Vålerenga Ishockey players